The Bayer designations b Velorum and B Velorum are distinct. Due to technical limitations, both designations link here. For the star

b Velorum, see HD 74180
B Velorum, see HD 70930

Vela (constellation)